Forest Den is a national park in Queensland, Australia, 991 km northwest of Brisbane.

A great variety of plants is represented in the park, and the most important role of this national park is the preservation of black gidgee.

The park is located at 243 meters above sea level.

References

See also

 Protected areas of Queensland

National parks of Queensland
Protected areas established in 1991
Central West Queensland
1991 establishments in Australia